"A Child Asleep" is a song, with lyrics from a poem written by Elizabeth Barrett Browning.  It was set to music by the English composer Edward Elgar in December 1909 and published in 1910 by Novello. It was first published by Browning in 1840.

It is dedicated to Anthony Goetz, the son of Ludovic Goetz and Muriel Foster, a favourite singer and personal friend of Elgar.

Lyrics

Recordings
The Unknown Elgar includes "A Child Asleep" performed by Teresa Cahill (soprano), with Barry Collett (piano).
The Songs of Edward Elgar SOMM CD 220 Catherine Wyn-Rogers (soprano) with Malcolm Martineau (piano), at Southlands College, London, April 1999

References

Percy Young, Elgar O.M.

External links

Songs about children
Songs by Edward Elgar
Poetry by Elizabeth Barrett Browning
1840 poems
1909 songs